Dobrun is the name of several rural localities in Bryansk Oblast, Russia:
Dobrun, Bryansky District, Bryansk Oblast, a village in Bryansky District
Dobrun, Sevsky District, Bryansk Oblast, a settlement in Sevsky District
Dobrun, Suzemsky District, Bryansk Oblast, a selo in Suzemsky District